Saint Gregory the Illuminator Church (Surb Grigor Lusavorich yekeghets'i) was an Armenian Apostolic church in Yerevan, Armenia, that was destroyed in 1939. It was where Yeghishe Charents School is now on Amiryan Street, Yerevan.

See also
Saint Paul and Peter Church, Yerevan
Gethsemane Chapel
History of Yerevan

External links
St. Gregory the Illuminator church

Armenian Apostolic church buildings in Yerevan
19th-century churches in Armenia
Demolished churches in the Soviet Union
19th-century Oriental Orthodox church buildings
Demolished buildings and structures in Armenia